Fortune Told in Blood (Fal-E Khoon) is a novel by Davud Ghaffarzadegan about an Iraqi lieutenant and soldier in the Iran-Iraq war. The novel known as a modern war story. Fortune Told in Blood's context is an important feature of the novel. The main language of the book is Persian and it was published in 1996 by Soreie Mehr Publication Company. M.R. Ghanoonparvar, emeritus professor of Persian language and literature in the University of Texas, translated the book into English in 2008, published by Center for Middle Eastern Studies at University of Texas at Austin. The Center for Middle Eastern Studies has experience more than 20 years and has published several translated literature book from the Middle East. The book won award of "A Quarter Century of Sacred Defense Books" festival in the novel category between 700 books.

Narrative 
Fortune Told in Blood is a novel about two Iraqi soldiers in Iran-Iraq war. There is difference between them but the war demolished their life. An Iraqi lieutenant and soldier sent on a mountain for identifying Iranian movements and installations. The lieutenant sees the area with field glass for tagging Iranian position on the map. Their situation on mountain was relatively safe and they could snowbound in their trench. For this reason, they did not worry and fear. They had many magazines and cartomancy in their trench. One day after lunch, they divined and saw bloody events in their omen. After this day occurred bloody events for them.

Author 
Davud Ghaffarzadegan, the Iranian teacher and writer, was born in 1959 in Ardebil. He wrote more than two decades and published over twenty-five short story collections and novels for adults and teenagers. His stories were translated into English, Chinese, Turkish, and Arabic. In the Fortune Told in Blood, he wrote the novel from the Iraqi's view and emphasized the human role in war. The novel and its suitable translation outspread the Iran-Iraq war to the west.

Publisher 
The book was written in 1996 and published in Persian by Soreie Mehr Publication Company in 2011. Fortune Told in Blood has been nominated for and received numerous awards, and has been reprinted many times in Iran. According to critics, Fortune Told in Blood is one of the most prominent novels about the Iran-Iraq war in recent years. In 2008, the book was translated from Persian into English by Mohammad Reza Ghanounparvar and published by Center for Middle Eastern Studies at University of Texas at Austin. The Center for Middle Eastern Studies has experience more than 20 years and has published several translated literature book from the Middle East.

Translator 
Mohammad Reza Ghanoonparvar is UT Professor of Persian and Comparative Literature. Ghanoonparvar has written several books about Persian literature and culture as In a Persian Mirror (1993), Translating the Garden (2001), Reading Chubak (2005), and Persian Cuisine (2006). By the Pen, The Patient Stone, Savushun, and The Myth of Creation are the books that Ghanoonparvar has translated into English.

Awards 
On 27 September 2009, Fortune Told in Blood won award of "A Quarter Century of Sacred Defense Books" festival in the novel category. The book was selected between 700 books in the festival.

See also 

Chess with the Doomsday Machine
Eternal Fragrance
Journey to Heading 270 Degrees
Noureddin, Son of Iran
One Woman's War: Da (Mother)
That Which That Orphan Saw
The Night Bus
Baba Nazar (book)

References

External links 
 Fortune Told in Blood in Google book
 In a Persian Mirror: Images of the West and Westerners in Iranian Fiction
 Translating the Garden (2001)
 Reading Chubak (2005)
 Persian Cuisine. Traditional, Regional, and Modern Foods

1996 novels
Iranian novels
Novels set during the Iran–Iraq War
Persian-language novels
1980 in Iran